Sutton Scarsdale is a village in Derbyshire, England. It is in the North East Derbyshire district. It is very close to the M1 motorway. It is in the civil parish of Sutton cum Duckmanton.

The settlement is notable for a large, ruined former stately home called Sutton Scarsdale Hall. Near to the settlement are the villages of Heath, Temple Normanton and Arkwright Town.
Scarsdale, New York is named after the village.

Early history
This manor was in the Domesday book in 1086. Under the title of “The lands of Roger de Poitou” it said: In Sutton Scarsdale Stenulf had four carucates of land to the geld. Land for five ploughs. The lord has there one plough and six villans and one bordar with one plough, There is a mill rendering two shillings and eight acres of meadow. Woodland pasture half a league long and three furlongs broad. TRE worth forty shillings now twenty shillings.

Bess of Hardwick
Bess of Hardwick built a house, "Oldcotes" or "Owlcotes", where Arbella Stuart stayed in 1603, south of Sutton Scarsdale. The building was completely demolished.

References and notes

See also
 Listed buildings in Sutton cum Duckmanton
 List of places in Derbyshire

External links

 360° Panorama of Sutton Scarsdale Hall

Villages in Derbyshire
North East Derbyshire District